Beth Robert is a Welsh television actress from Pont-rhyd-y-groes, Wales, who has worked in television since 1986. Her appearances in TV series, in Welsh and English, include Hinterland, The Indian Doctor and Pobol y Cwm.

Early and personal life

Robert comes from the village of Pont-rhyd-y-groes near Aberystwyth. She went on to study at the College of Music and Drama in Cardiff, and graduated in 1986.

Robert is married to Paul Harris. They met in Porthmadog in March 2000. They have one daughter together.

Her father died when she was in her early twenties.

Career

Robert portrayed Lisa Morgan in the Welsh soap Pobol y Cwm for the first time in January 1990. In 1997, Lisa, Beth's character, was part of the first kiss between two women on Welsh television. Robert left the series again in 2000. After an absence of 19 years the actress returned to the series and was in numerous prominent storylines between 2019 and 2021.

Between 2005 and 2008 she starred as Judith in Con Passionate, before playing Myra in Teulu, a Welsh-language drama series that ran for five series.

Her English language roles include the Sky One comedy-drama Stella, and two series of Young Dracula on CBBC.

Filmography

Television

References

External links
 

Living people
People from Ceredigion
Welsh television actresses
Year of birth missing (living people)